{{DISPLAYTITLE:E6 polytope}}

In 6-dimensional geometry, there are 39 uniform polytopes with E6 symmetry. The two simplest forms are the 221 and 122 polytopes, composed of 27 and 72 vertices respectively.

They can be visualized as symmetric orthographic projections in Coxeter planes of the E6 Coxeter group, and other subgroups.

Graphs 

Symmetric orthographic projections of these 39 polytopes can be made in the E6, D5, D4, D2, A5, A4, A3 Coxeter planes. Ak has k+1 symmetry, Dk has 2(k-1) symmetry, and E6 has 12 symmetry.

Six symmetry planes graphs are shown for 9 of the 39 polytopes in the E6 symmetry. The vertices and edges drawn with vertices colored by the number of overlapping vertices in each projective position.

References
 H.S.M. Coxeter:
 H.S.M. Coxeter, Regular Polytopes, 3rd Edition, Dover New York, 1973
 Kaleidoscopes: Selected Writings of H.S.M. Coxeter, edited by F. Arthur Sherk, Peter McMullen, Anthony C. Thompson, Asia Ivic Weiss, Wiley-Interscience Publication, 1995,  Wiley::Kaleidoscopes: Selected Writings of H.S.M. Coxeter
 (Paper 22) H.S.M. Coxeter, Regular and Semi Regular Polytopes I, [Math. Zeit. 46 (1940) 380-407, MR 2,10]
 (Paper 23) H.S.M. Coxeter, Regular and Semi-Regular Polytopes II, [Math. Zeit. 188 (1985) 559-591]
 (Paper 24) H.S.M. Coxeter, Regular and Semi-Regular Polytopes III, [Math. Zeit. 200 (1988) 3-45]
 N.W. Johnson: The Theory of Uniform Polytopes and Honeycombs, Ph.D. Dissertation, University of Toronto, 1966
 

6-polytopes